Katrin Aladjova-Kusznirczuk (born Katrin Peneva Aladjova, Bulgarian Катрин Пенева Аладжова, listed with FIDE as Katrin Aladjova; 21 June 1971 in Sofia, Bulgaria) is a Bulgarian-Australian chess Woman FIDE Master (WFM).

She was 1986 World Under-16 Girl's Chess Champion and 1989 World Under-18 Girl's Chess Champion.

Chess career 
In 1986 she won the Under-16 World Youth Chess Championship (Girls) in Río Gallegos, Argentina and gained the title of Woman FIDE Master (WFM). In this event she scored 9.5/11 winning from Ketevan Kakhiani on tiebreak, and finishing half a point ahead of Judit Polgar.

In 1989 she won the Under-18 World Youth Chess Championship (Girls) in Aguadilla, Puerto Rico. In the same event, the Bulgarian chess players Veselin Topalov won the Under-14 World Youth Championship and Antoaneta Stefanova won the Under-10 World Youth Championship (Girls), sparking an increased interest in chess in Bulgaria.

Aladjova won the 1992 Australian Women's Chess Championship in Melbourne, Australia. She also won other women's chess events in Australia in 1993 and 1994, before retiring as a professional tournament chess player.

In May 2007, Aladjova was invited as a guest dignitary and commentator for the M-Tel Masters super-GM chess tournament in Sofia, and was interviewed by the French GM Robert Fontaine for Europe Echecs.

Katrin was President of Chess Victoria from 2007 to November 2009. Since 2013 she has been a Chess Victoria Ambassador and a Board Member. She continues to promote the game of chess providing peer support to young chess players in her state of Victoria particularly women of all ages in Australia who enjoy playing the game of chess.

Personal life 
Aladjova learnt chess from her father when she was six years old. In 1989, she married and moved to Melbourne Australia. She remarried in 2011. Katrin Aladjova-Kusznirczuk has a Bachelor of Business from Victoria University, Australia. She is the co-founder and Director of "All Australia Imports Pty.Ltd." and "StreetStar Cosmetics". Katrin was appointed as a Director of the Board of "VITS LanguageLink". Her appointment was endorsed by Cabinet and was ratified by Governor in Council on 24 April 2012. She served on the Board of Directors until May 2016. She is also an ambassador for the Victorian Government's Vision for Language Education – Love of Language program.

Notable Games 
Katrin Aladjova vs Utut Adianto, Australian Open 1990, Zukertort Opening: Symmetrical Variation (A04), 0-1
Katrin Aladjova vs Alisa Galliamova, Weliko 1990, King's Indian Attack: Spassky Variation (A05) 1-0

References

External links

 
 Video interview with Katrin Aladjova by GM Robert Fontaine
 Homepage StreetStar Cosmetics
 Board of Directors VITS LanguageLink
  Love of Language KATRIN ALADJOVA-KUSZNIRCZUK
  Love of Language
  Board of Directors VITS Annual Report 2015-2016
  Katrin Aladjova 15, playing men in a 'simultaneous' chess game in a Brisbane

Australian female chess players
Bulgarian emigrants to Australia
Living people
1971 births
Chess players from Sofia
Bulgarian female chess players
Chess Woman FIDE Masters